Brigadier Pieter de Waal  (31 December 1899, ZeerustJune 1977, Wynberg) was a South African military commander.  He joined the Union Defence Forces as a coastal gunner in 1922.

Military career

From 1934 to 1940, he was Director of Operations and Training (under various titles) at Defence Headquarters.  He served as Deputy Chief of the General Staff from 1940 until 1944, when he was seconded to the staff of General Dwight Eisenhower as South African Liaison Officer to Supreme Headquarters Allied Expeditionary Forces in England for the rest of World War II.

After the war, Brig de Waal served as Quartermaster-General from 1945 to 1951, and as Naval and Marine Chief of Staff from 1951 to 1952.  As NMCS he was in command of both the South African Navy and the short-lived South Africa Marine Corps.

He served as Military & Naval Attaché to the US from 1953 to 1954

Awards and decorations

Companion of the Order of the Bath

On 1 January 1946, Brigadier de Waal was made a Companion of the Order of the Bath. The Notice in the London Gazette reads as follows:

Commander of the Order of the British Empire

On 1 January 1944, Brigadier de Waal was made a Commander of the Order of the British Empire. The Notice in the London Gazette reads as follows:

List

See also

List of South African military chiefs
South African Navy

References

|-

1899 births
1977 deaths
Afrikaner people
South African people of Dutch descent
Chiefs of the South African Navy
South African Commanders of the Order of the British Empire
Graduates of the Staff College, Camberley
Military attachés